Barom Reachea I (1521–1576) was the Cambodian king who reigned from 1566 to 1576. 

Barom Reachea I was the second son of Ang Chan I. During his reign, Siam was at war with Burma. Since 1569, Burmese occupied the Siamese capital Ayuttaya for fifteen years. Seizing the opportunity, Cambodia launched a counter-offensive against Siam. Cambodian army recaptured the northwest provinces, and moved the capital back to Angkor in 1570.

References

1576 deaths
16th-century Cambodian monarchs